The 2017 Serbian White Eagles FC season was the twenty first season in the club's participation in the Canadian Soccer League (including Canadian National Soccer League days).They began the season on May 26, 2017 at home against SC Waterloo Region. Throughout the season they maintained their traditional status of an elite club by finishing the season as runners up in the regular season. They only recorded one defeat and achieved the second best offensive record. In the postseason they failed to successfully defend their CSL Championship after losing to York Region Shooters in the semifinals.

Summary 
The White Eagles entered the 2017 CSL season as the defending champions with Uroš Stamatović returning to manage the squad for the season. Serbia continued its strategy of recruiting seasoned imports from Europe, while also rejuvenating the roster with younger graduates from their youth system. The new additions included Luka Milidragović, Dušan Kovačević, and Ivan Nikolic. They also continued fielding their reserve team in the Second Division.

While their on field performance continued to prosper as the White Eagles began the season with a 12-game undefeated streak. Their only defeat occurred in an away match, while at home they remained undefeated. Serbia concluded the regular season as runners up and was ranked in the top three for the best offensive and defensive records. In the preliminary round of the postseason they defeated SC Waterloo by a score of 5-3. Unfortunately they failed to defend the CSL Championship after being eliminated by the York Region Shooters.

Players

Roster

Management

Competitions

Canadian Soccer League

League table

First Division

Results summary

Results by round

Matches

League table

Second Division

Results summary

Results by round

Statistics

Goals and assists 
Correct as of November 2, 2017

References  
 

Serbian White Eagles FC seasons
Serbian White Eagles FC
Serbian White Eagles FC